Sajid Tarar is a Pakistani American businessman from Baltimore, a Pro Trump Republican party leader and founder of American Muslims for Trump. He was advisor for Muslims to former President Trump. He is CEO of non-profit private organization Center for Social Change. He is known for his support for President Donald Trump and Islamic prayer at  2016 Republican National Convention.

Personal life 
He moved to United States from Pakistan as an international student for University education, and after completing his studies in the US he settled there. He is a father of 4 kids.

References

External links 
 Sajid Tarar Urdu interview with Jirga's Saleem Safi (Urdu)

American people of Pakistani descent
Living people
Pakistani diaspora in the United States
Pakistani American
America
Punjabi people
South Asian American
Year of birth missing (living people)